The 1996–97 season was the 96th season in Athletic Bilbao's history and their 66th consecutive season in La Liga, the top division of Spanish football.

Season summary

Athletic had been without a permanent head coach since replacing Dragoslav Stepanović with caretaker manager José María Amorrortu in March 1996. They filled the vacancy ahead of the new season by appointing Spanish-born Frenchman Luis Fernández, previously manager of Paris Saint-Germain in his adopted homeland.

Fernández's appointment led to an immediate improvement in league form, and Bilbao finished the La Liga season in 6th place. This was their best league finish since 1993–94, and also meant a return to the UEFA Cup in 1997–98.

Their performance in the Copa del Rey, however, left room for improvement. They were eliminated at the last sixteen stage by Racing Santander, following an ill-tempered second leg at San Mamés which saw three players red carded.

Squad statistics

Appearances and goals

|}
1. Mendiguren was transferred to Las Palmas during the season.
2. Bolo was loaned to Osasuna during the season.

Results

La Liga

League table

See also
1996–97 La Liga
1996–97 Copa del Rey

External links

References

Athletic Bilbao
Athletic Bilbao seasons